Collective protection is used for group protection of personnel in a nuclear, biological or chemical event, (NBC).

Collective protection is an important aspect of fixed site defense.
Ideally, it provides a contaminate free environment for people, allowing relief from the continuous wearing of gas masks and other MOPP equipment.

The basic concept applied for collective protection is overpressure and filtration.
By filtering the incoming air to the shelter or protected space and maintaining higher internal air pressure than the external pressure, the contaminated external air is prevented from infiltrating the shelter or protected space and results in a toxic free area (TFA) for work and relief from wearing MOPP equipment.

The most critical component of any collective protection area is the air filtration system. The US Army Corps of Engineers has published stringent standards for the construction and performance of this type of equipment.

See also
 Fallout shelter

Notes

References 

Home and Apartment Safe Rooms This website offers information and products to construct collective protection inside residential construction.

Chemical, biological, radiological and nuclear defense